Potekhin is a surname. It may refer to:

Aleksei Potekhin (born 1972), Russian pop musician
Alexei Potekhin (1829–1908), Russian dramatist and novelist
Bogdan Potekhin (born 1992), Russian professional ice hockey player
Vasili Potekhin (born 1974), retired Russian professional footballer

Russian-language surnames